Colobothea meleagrina is a species of beetle in the family Cerambycidae. It was described by Wilhelm Ferdinand Erichson in 1847. IT is known from Bolivia, Ecuador and Peru.

References

meleagrina
Beetles described in 1847